Scyliorhinus is a genus of catsharks in the family Scyliorhinidae. This genus is known in the fossil records from the Cretaceous period, late Albian age to the Pliocene epoch.

Species
There are currently 16 recognized species in this genus:
 Scyliorhinus boa Goode & T. H. Bean, 1896 (boa catshark)
 Scyliorhinus cabofriensis K. D. A. Soares, U. L. Gomes & M. R. de Carvalho, 2016
 Scyliorhinus canicula (Linnaeus, 1758) (small-spotted catshark)
 Scyliorhinus capensis (J. P. Müller & Henle, 1838) (yellowspotted catshark)
 Scyliorhinus cervigoni Maurin & M. Bonnet, 1970 (West African catshark)
 Scyliorhinus comoroensis L. J. V. Compagno, 1988 (Comoro catshark)
 Scyliorhinus garmani (Fowler, 1934) (brownspotted catshark)
 Scyliorhinus hachijoensis (Ito, Fujii, Nohara & Tanaka, 2022) (cinder cloudy catshark)
 Scyliorhinus haeckelii (A. Miranda-Ribeiro, 1907) (freckled catshark) 
 Scyliorhinus hesperius S. Springer, 1966 (whitesaddled catshark)
 Scyliorhinus meadi S. Springer, 1966 (blotched catshark)
 Scyliorhinus retifer (Garman, 1881) (chain catshark)
 Scyliorhinus stellaris (Linnaeus, 1758) (nursehound)
 Scyliorhinus tokubee Shirai, S. Hagiwara & Nakaya, 1992 (Izu catshark)
 Scyliorhinus torazame (S. Tanaka (I), 1908) (cloudy catshark)
 Scyliorhinus torrei Howell-Rivero, 1936 (dwarf catshark)
 Scyliorhinus ugoi K. D. A. Soares, Gadig & U. L. Gomes, 2015 (dark freckled catshark)

Extinct species

 †Scyliorhinus ambliatlanticus Lautiro Mora, 1999 
 †Scyliorhinus angustus (Münster, 1843)
 †Scyliorhinus antiquus (Agassiz, 1843)
 †Scyliorhinus arambourgi Cappetta, 1980
 †Scyliorhinus arlingtonensis Cappetta & Case, 1999
 †Scyliorhinus biddlei Halter, 1995
 †Scyliorhinus biformis Reinecke, 2014
 †Scyliorhinus bloti Cappetta, 1980
 †Scyliorhinus brumarivulensis Underwood & Ward, 2008
 †Scyliorhinus cepaeformis Halter, 1990
 †Scyliorhinus coupatezi Herman, 1974
 †Scyliorhinus dubius (Woodward, 1889)
 †Scyliorhinus elongatus (Davis, 1887)
 †Scyliorhinus entomodon Noubhani & Cappetta, 1997
 †Scyliorhinus fossilis (Leriche, 1927)
 †Scyliorhinus ivagrantae Case & Cappetta, 1997
 †Scyliorhinus joleaudi Cappetta, 1970
 †Scyliorhinus kannenbergi Leder, 2015
 †Scyliorhinus kasenoi Karasawa, 1989
 †Scyliorhinus luypaertsi Halter, 1995
 †Scyliorhinus malembeensis Dartevelle & Casier, 1959
 †Scyliorhinus monsaugustus Guinot, Underwood, Cappetta & Ward, 2013
 †Scyliorhinus moosi Herman, 1975
 †Scyliorhinus muelleri Guinot, Underwood, Cappetta & Ward, 2013
 †Scyliorhinus musteliformis Herman, 1977
 †Scyliorhinus ptychtus Noubhani & Cappetta, 1997
 †Scyliorhinus reyndersi Halter, 1995
 †Scyliorhinus suelstorfensis Reinecke, 2014
 †Scyliorhinus sulcidens Noubhani & Cappetta, 1997
 †Scyliorhinus taylorensis Cappetta & Case, 1999
 †Scyliorhinus tensleepensis Case, 1987
 †Scyliorhinus trifolius Adnet, 2006
 †Scyliorhinus wardi Halter, 1990
 †Scyliorhinus weemsi, 2022
 †Scyliorhinus woodwardi Cappetta, 1976

References

 
Extant Albian first appearances
Shark genera
Taxa named by Henri Marie Ducrotay de Blainville